The Battle in the Bay of Matanzas was a naval battle during the Eighty Years' War in which a Dutch squadron was able to defeat and capture a Spanish treasure fleet.

Overview
In 1628, Admiral Piet Hein, with Witte de With as his flag captain, sailed out to capture the Spanish treasure fleet loaded with silver from their American colonies. With him was Admiral Hendrick Lonck, and he was later joined by a squadron of Vice-Admiral Joost Banckert. Part of the Spanish fleet in Venezuela had been warned because a Dutch cabin boy had lost his way on Blanquilla and was captured, betraying the plan, but the other half from Mexico continued its voyage, unaware of the threat. Sixteen Spanish ships were intercepted: one galleon was taken after a surprise encounter during the night, nine smaller merchants were talked into surrendering; two small ships were overtaken at sea, and four fleeing galleons were trapped on the Cuban coast in the Bay of Matanzas. After some musket volleys from Dutch sloops, these ships also surrendered.

Altogether, Hein captured 11,509,524 guilders of booty in gold, silver, and expensive trade goods, such as indigo and cochineal, without any bloodshed. The Dutch didn't keep their prisoners: they gave the Spanish crews ample supplies for a march to Havana. The released men were surprised to hear the admiral personally giving them directions in fluent Spanish; Hein after all was well acquainted with the language as he had been a Spanish prisoner after 1603. The taking of the treasure was the Dutch West India Company's greatest victory in the Caribbean.

Aftermath 
The money funded the Dutch army for eight months, allowing it to capture the fortress 's-Hertogenbosch, and the shareholders enjoyed a cash dividend of 50% for that year. Hein returned to the Netherlands in 1629, where he was hailed as a hero. Watching the crowds cheering him standing on the balcony of the town hall of Leiden he remarked to the town mayor: "Now they praise me because I gained riches without the least danger; but earlier when I risked my life in full combat they didn't even know I existed." He was the first and last to capture such a large part of a Spanish "silver fleet" from the Americas, these fleets being very well-protected.

Matanzas
Matanzas
Matanzas
Matanzas
Eighty Years' War (1621–1648)